Ivan Šramko (born 3 September 1957 in Bratislava, Czechoslovakia) served as the Governor of National Bank of Slovakia since January 2005 to January 2010. Šramko is notable for overseeing Slovakia's adoption of the Euro currency in 2009. As a Governor, he was considered an inflation hawk.

Career
Šramko studied at the University of Economics in Bratislava, graduating in 1980 in Management.  In the 1990s he served on managing boards of various Slovak banks. Šramko joined the Board of the National Bank of Slovakia in 2002 as Deputy Governor and was appointed Governor effective 1 January 2005.

After the end of his term as the Governor he was appointed the ambassador of Slovakia to the OECD. Between 2012 and 2020 he served as the Chairman of the Council for Budget Responsibility.

References

1957 births
Governors of the National Bank of Slovakia
Living people
People from Bratislava
University of Economics in Bratislava alumni